London Rowing Club (LRC, or colloquially, 'London') is the second-oldest of the non-academic active rowing clubs on the Thames in London, United Kingdom. It was founded in 1856 by members of the long-disbanded Argonauts Club wishing to compete at Henley Royal Regatta.

It is regarded as one of the most successful rowing clubs in Britain and its patron was Prince Philip, Duke of Edinburgh.

History
The club was founded in 1856 at the instigation of Herbert Playford, A. A. Casamajor and Josias Nottidge for the purpose of promoting rowing on the river Thames and winning medals at Henley Royal Regatta.  These three formed part of the crew that won the Grand Challenge Cup at Henley in 1857.  LRC is the second oldest of the non-academic type in London; the oldest is Poplar Blackwall and District Rowing Club having taken that status from Leander Club which gradually migrated from 1897 to 1961 to Henley on Thames in Oxfordshire.

The club and its members were fundamental in the setting up and evolution of the Metropolitan Regatta

It is one of the seven founding clubs of the Remenham Club at Henley and was one of five clubs which retained the right to appoint representatives directly to the Council of British Rowing. This right was removed from those five clubs in September 2012.

Modern day
Phelan Hill was the cox of the Rio Olympic Games in 2016 Gold Medal Open eight.  Jess Eddie was in the Women's eight that won the Silver Medal at Rio Olympic Games in 2016

Sophie Hosking the Gold Medal winner and Rob Williams competed for Great Britain at the London Olympic Games in 2012 in the women's lightweight double sculls and men's lightweight coxless four.

Most recently the club won the Wyfolds in 2011 and also provided half of the oarsmen in the composite international lightweight crews that won the Club Quads in 2007.

Two of its members, James Lindsay-Fynn and James Clarke, competed in the Beijing Olympic Games in 2008 as part of the Lightweight Men's Coxless Fours.  Nick Strange and Ben Helm competed in the Lightweight double sculls and Lightweight four at the Atlanta Olympic Games in 1996. The London lightweight four of 1994; Butt, Watson, Strange and Helm set a Worlds best time for Open and Lightweight fours of 05:48:86 (Paris, May '94)

Facilities
London Rowing Club began in rented rooms at Star & Garter Pub in Putney. Today, the club has a substantial boathouse (altered and extended in 1974, 2008 and 2018/19) by Putney Bridge.
The new Peter Coni Gym was opened in 2019 by present and past club Presidents Mike Baldwin and Mike Williams. It occupies the space over the rowing tank that dated back to the 1920s, the old men's changing room and the old gym.  The design specification required a low carbon footprint resulting in a modern passive ventilation system among other items.  At the opening some of the membership commented that "at least one can now close the holes in the walls".

Members
Former members of the club include the British racing driver Graham Hill, the Formula One World Champion in 1962 and 1968 and only driver to win the Triple Crown of Motorsport. From 1952 to 1954, Hill rowed in twenty finals with London, usually as stroke of the crew, eight of which resulted in wins. He also stroked the London eight for the highly ranked clubs/composites cup at Henley Royal Regatta. He used the colours of the club as his motor racing helmet design, as have his descendants, Formula One World Champion racing driver son, Damon, and Formula Renault driver Josh.

Current club members include international rowers for Great Britain, Ireland and Germany, and include: 
James Clarke
Jess Eddie
Danny Harte
Phelan Hill
Stephen Feeney
Sophie Hosking
James Lindsay-Fynn
Mathilde Pauls
Rob Williams

The former chief coach was Australian silver medallist Paul Reedy.

Honours

Recent British champions

Henley Royal Regatta

See also 
 Rowing on the River Thames
Head of the River Race
Metropolitan Regatta
 Thames Rowing Club

References
 Water Boiling Aft: London Rowing Club, the First 150 Years 1856-2006 Author Christopher Dodd

External links
 Official website

Sports clubs established in 1856
Remenham Club Founding Clubs
Tideway Rowing clubs
Sport in the London Borough of Wandsworth
1856 establishments in England
Rowing clubs of the River Thames